Mestre Cobra Mansa (born Cinézio Feliciano Peçanha, 1960 in Duque de Caxias, Brazil) commonly known as Cobrinha and Cobrinha Mansa, is a mestre or master of Capoeira Angola. He is one of the founders and the guiding light of an organization known as FICA (in Portuguese, an acronym for Fundaçao Internacional de Capoeira de Angola) or ICAF (in English, this stands for the International Capoeira Angola Foundation, which is the literal translation of the words which make up the acronym FICA). FICA/ICAF is the largest standing Capoeira Organization in the world, its influence spanning several continents, having schools and centers that collaborate with US NGO's and other affiliates from the United States. These partnering organizations are located in several countries around the world with locations in North and South America, Europe, and Asia.

Grupo Capoeira Angola Pelorinho (GCAP) 
In 1981, Mansa started with the Grupo Capoeira Angola Pelorinho (GCAP), aimed towards children and orphans with rough backgrounds in  Salvador, Bahia.

At some point during the later years of GCAP, Cobrinha and Moraes had a difference over the direction of the school where they were both authority figures. The result was the departure of Mestre Cobrinha and several other members of GCAP as well as the formation of FICA.

History

Mestre Cobra Mansa is well known for his work in the world of Capoeira. He began his practice of Capoeira in 1973 with Josias da Silva and Raimundo in the Rio neighborhood of Duque de Caxias. He played Capoeira in the Duque Caxias street rodas and was one of the founders of the Caxias Street Roda with Rogerio Russo and Peixinho de Caxias. (A roda literally means circle, and is the formation of persons that surround a game of the martial dance of Capoeira.) In 1974 Cobra Mansa became a student of Mestre Moraes after he saw Moraes play in the Roda of Central Brazil.  Prior to dedicating his life to Capoeira Angola,  he worked in photography, as a street vendor in a circus (Circo Picolino) and even served as a police officer for 2 years in the state of Belo Horizonte.

On invitation from the Aussar Auset Society, Cobrinha moved to the United States and opened a school in Washington DC around 1994, which was solely dedicated to the teaching of Capoeira Angola. He later became an adjunct professor at George Washington University, and then eventually president of the newly formed FICA.  In 2004 he left the United States to make his home in Bahia, Salvador, Brazil to create the Kilombo Tenondé. This organization is currently split over two sites, one in Valença, Bahia. Quilombo Tenondé provides space for Capoeira and permacultura (permaculture - organic farming). The other site is a cultural center at Coutos in the suburb of Salvador.

His Style

Cobra Mansa's nicknames (Cobra Mansa meaning "tame snake" and Cobrinha translating to "little cobra" in Portuguese) are apt descriptions derived from Cobra Mansa's graceful and deceptive style of play. His ability to transform situations through the use of innovative and acrobatic solutions has made him arguably the most influential Angoleiro (practitioner of Capoeira Angola) of his generation.  Never one to avoid the complexity of Capoeira Regional, he has traveled in many non-Angolan circles and done a great deal to help mend old disagreements between the two.  His Capoeira continues to be respected and admired through both the Capoeira Angola and Capoeira Regional communities. He remains an inspiration to many younger Capoeiristas.

Mestre Cobrinha is well known as a mestre of Capoeira Angola. He is well respected for his deep knowledge and scholarship of the historical and cultural underpinnings of Capoeira Angola, as well as for his dynamic and aggressive style of play in the roda.

He recently completed a journey to the west-central region of Africa to search for the African roots of Capoeira.  He spent time in Angola and Mozambique learning about the "N'golo (Zebra dance)" and other local African cultural traditions that have been attributed in the past as contributing to the development of Capoeira.  He also conducted a workshop in South Africa where he shared his knowledge and experiences.

Lineage 
 The "lineage" of Capoeira Angola mestres under Mestre Pastinha

References

External links
  Official homepage

1960 births
Living people
Brazilian police officers
Capoeira mestres
Brazilian capoeira practitioners
People from Duque de Caxias, Rio de Janeiro